Thierry José Roland (4 August 1937 – 16 June 2012) was a French sports commentator who was France's leading football commentator for 59 years. He began his career as a radio journalist for the ORTF when he was just 16 years old. Roland then became a television sports journalist at age 20. He commentated on more than 1,000 football matches, including thirteen World Cups (beginning with the 1962 FIFA World Cup in Chile) and nine UEFA European Championships. He was nicknamed La voix du football ("The voice of football").

Roland was born in Boulogne-Billancourt, a suburban city just southwest of Paris. He died in the 15th arrondissement of Paris of a cerebrovascular event at age 74.

Bibliography 
 La légende de la coupe du monde, Minerva, 1998
 La Fabuleuse histoire de la Coupe du monde, Minerva, October 2002
 Mes 100 plus grands matchs, Larousse, October 2005
 Mes 100 plus grands joueurs, Larousse, May 2006
 100 % Bleus, Solar, 2008
 Mes 13 coupes du monde, Edition du Rocher, April 2010
 Mes plus grands moments de football, Larousse, May 2012

Commentator style 
Some of Thierry Roland's expressions in his comments of matches, such as: "These two will not spend their holidays together", "Broke like a rabbit in full flight", "He swallowed the trumpet", "The balloon is went in the zig and he went in the zag "," He did not make the trip for nothing "or" This is not the right line of Longchamp ", contributed to his popularity.

But, he was also very criticized for his frankness, for his insults towards the referee ("Mr. Foote, you are a bastard !") or about a Romanian referee "I've never seen such a manure! Michel Hidalgo told me yesterday that Romanians were the easiest to buy ", its sexism and some expressions with racist connotation or simply abusive. Thus, commenting on the final of the 1966 Coupe de France for the ORTF, he explained after the victory of RC Strasbourg that "the Cup left France".

His particular style earned him a recurring caricature of the humorous show Les Guignols de l'info.

Tribute 
Following the death of Thierry Roland, a minute of silence was observed in his honor during the France-Sweden UEFA Euro 2012 match in Kyiv.

On February 6, 2013, the press gallery of the Stade de France was renamed to its name, during the France-Germany friendly match.

References 

1937 births
2012 deaths
Deaths in Paris
Lycée Janson-de-Sailly alumni
Deaths from cerebrovascular disease
Burials at Passy Cemetery
French sports journalists
French television personalities
People from Boulogne-Billancourt
French people of Russian descent
Association football commentators
French male non-fiction writers